Alexander Alexandrovich Maysuryan (b. June 15, 1969 in Moscow) is a Russian author and far-left political activist.
He is a journalist, and the author of works on history and biology.

Personal life and education
He is of Armenian origin.
Alexander Maysuryan is a distant relative of Alexander Atabekian.
He studied at Moscow State University's Faculty of Biology. For 1987—1989 he lived in Murmansk Oblast.
Now he is called a Moscow blogger.
Boris Stomakhin corresponded with him. Maysuryan is a Marxist.

Career
Alexander Maysuryan is a political journalist.
He is a member of the Democratic Union. He also is a human rights activist, and a blogger (at LiveJournal, listed in the Top 100 bloggers).
Maysuryan starred in documentaries as a writer.
He is the editor of The Encyclopedia for Children (Аванта +, 1994).
He is the author of books including "Развитие в природе, культуре и истории : исслед. в форме диалогов" (Клуб XXI в., 2000, 384 p.).
He is a biographer of Lenin and Brezhnev. He worked in a museum for over ten years.

Books
 Энциклопедия для детей. Т. 2. Биология («Аванта+», 1993; 1994, ISBN 5-86529-012-6; 1996).
 Энциклопедия для детей : 13 т. Т. 5: История России : ч. 3. ХХ век / ред. т. А. Майсурян. – М., 1995. – 672 с. : ил. ; – 100000 экз. – ISBN 5-86529-042-8. 
 «Другой Брежнев» (М.: «Вагриус», 2004) ISBN 5-475-00021-2.
 Aleksandr Maisurjan.  "Teistmoodi Brežnev".. Varrak, 2013. ISBN 9789985327067.
 «Другой Ленин» (М.: «Вагриус», 2006) ISBN 5-9697-0297-7.

References

External links
 Official site (in Russian)
 Official Maysuryan Blog

1969 births
Living people
20th-century Russian historians
Russian human rights activists
Russian political activists
Russian opinion journalists
Russian anti-war activists
Russian Marxists
Russian bloggers
21st-century Russian journalists
21st-century Russian historians